Abū Naṣr Alī ibn Hibat Allāh ibn Ja'far ibn Allakān ibn Muḥammad ibn Dulaf ibn Abī Dulaf al-Qāsim ibn ‘Īsā al-Ijlī, surnamed Sa’d al-Muluk and known as Ibn Mākūlā (1030/31–1082/83) was a highly regarded Persian muḥaddith (Ḥadīth scholar) who authored several works. His magnum opus was his biographical-genealogical history on etymology and orthography of Islamic names, Al-Ikmāl.

Life
Abū Naṣr ibn Mākūlā was born in the village Ukbara on the Tigris north of Baghdad to a noble Persian family. He was the son of Hibat Allah ibn Makula, vizier to the Buyid ruler of Basrah, Jalal al-Dawla. 

He gained the title ‘al-Amīr’, or ‘prince’, maybe in his own right, or in reference to his famous ancestor Abu Dulaf al-Ijli.   His family had originally come from Jarbāzakān, between Hamadan and Isfahan in Iran, but his paternal uncle, was a muḥaddith (traditionist),  and qāḍī (chief justice) in Baghdād where Ibn Mākūlā began his studies. He continued his education by travelling to the regional centres of learning across Irāq, Khurasan, Syria, Egypt, and Fars. In the last years of his life he held various official posts in the imperial administration of the Seljuk Empire, and once led an embassy to Bukhara to obtain the recognition of the new Abbasid Caliphate caliph al-Muqtadi (1075-1094).

One anecdote tells of a personal application made by Ibn Mākūlā on behalf of the grammarian Al-Akhfash al-Asghar|al-Akhfash the Younger, requesting a pension from the vizier Abu al-Hasan Ali ibn Isa.  This was angrily rejected it seems and the scholar was left in abject poverty.

In the account of his eventual assassination the sources differ on details of location and date. It seems that sometime, either in 475 h. [1082/1083] or 487 h. [1094/95], or 479 h. [1086/87], he was on a trip for Khurasan when he was murdered and robbed by his Mamluk guards, either in Jurjan in Golestan Province, or al-Ahvaz in Khuzestan; or in Kirman, Iran.

Works
Al-Ikmāl (‘Completion’); full title al-Ikmāl fī raf’ al-irtiyāb ‘an al-mu’talif wa al-mukhtalif min al-asmā’ wa al-kunā wa al-ansāb; 4 vols., (written 10711075) standard treatise on orthography and pronunciation of proper names.Note: Originally published as a supplement to Al-Khātib Abū Bakr's Al-Mutanif Takmila al-Mukhtalif (‘The recommenced, being the completion of the Mukhtalif’), or Al-Takmila, itself the combined works of: i) Al-Mūtalif wa Mukhtalif by Al-Daraqutni and ii) Al-Mushtabih Al-Nisba from the Al-Kamāl fī ma’rifat asmā’ al-Rijāl by ḥāfiẓ Abd al-Ghānī.
— In 1232, muhaddith Ibn Nukta, published Takmila al-Ikmāl, as an addendum to Al-Ikmāl.
Kitāb Tahdhib mustamar al-Awham ‘alā dhuī al-ma’rifat wa awwalī  al-Afhām
Mufākharat al-qalam wa’l-sayf wa’l-dīnār;
Taʾrīkh al-Wuzarā ('History of the Viziers').

Notes

References

External links/References
 Ali ibn Makula's publications
 ARABIC BOOKS BY IBN MAKULA, ALI IBN HIBAT ALLAH

See also
Encyclopædia Britannica Online
List of Arab scientists and scholars

 Vadet, J.-C . "Ibn Mākūlā." Encyclopaedia of Islam, second edition. Edited by: P. Bearman, Th. Bianquis, C.E. Bosworth, E. van Donzel, W.P. Heinrichs. Brill Online, 2016. Reference. June 7, 2016 http://referenceworks.brillonline.com/entries/encyclopaedia-of-islam-2/ibn-makula-SIM_3280

1030s births
1083 deaths
11th-century Iranian people
11th-century writers
Scholars under the Buyid dynasty
Etymologists
Genealogists
Iranian writers